Szczecin is the capital of West Pomeranian Voivodeship (north-west Poland).

Szczecin may also refer to:

Szczecin, Kuyavian-Pomeranian Voivodeship (north-central Poland)
Szczecin, Łódź Voivodeship (central Poland)

See also
Stettin (disambiguation)